The Montana State Legislature is the state legislature of the U.S. state of Montana. It is composed of the 100-member Montana House of Representatives and the 50-member Montana Senate.

List of members by name
This is a list of current and former notable members of the Montana House of Representatives by last name.
 Forrest H. Anderson
 LeRoy H. Anderson
 Duane Ankney
 J. Hugo Aronson
 Shannon Augare
 Tim M. Babcock
 Thomas C. Bach
 Joe Balyeat
 Liz Bangerter
 Debby Barrett
 James F. Battin
 Max Baucus
 Arlene Becker
 Bryce Bennett
 Gerald Bennett - District 1
 Bob Bergren
 Norma Bixby
 Mark Blasdel
 Anders Blewett
 John Bohlinger
 Carlie Boland
 Steve Bolstad
 Dorothy Bradley
 Gary Branae
 Bob Brown
 Dee L. Brown
 Roy Brown
 Walter A. Burleigh
 Mary Caferro
 Tim Callahan
 Albert J. Campbell
 Margarett Campbell
 Christy Clark
 Vicki Cocchiarella
 Jill Cohenour
 Mike Cooney
 Douglas Cordier
 Wesley A. D'Ewart
 Steve Daines
 Sue Dickenson
 Robyn Driscoll
 E. Jocob Crull
 Bob Ebinger
 Zales Ecton
 Caldwell Edwards
 Jim Elliott
 Ron Erickson
 Tom Facey
 Steve Fitzpatrick
 Orvin B. Fjare
 Henry Frank
 Eve Franklin
 Julie French
 Kevin Furey
 Dave Gallik
 Steve Gallus
 Kim Gillan
 Wanda Grinde
 George Groesback
 Steve Gunderson - District 1
 Alan Hale
 Robin Hamilton
 Betsy Hands
 Dan Harrington
 Ralph Heinert
 Teresa Henry
 Frank G. Higgins
 Cynthia Hiner
 Galen Hollenbaugh
 Elmer Holt
 Hal Jacobson
 Joey Jayne
 Larry Jent
 Llew Jones
 Mike Jopek
 Rick Jore
 Thomas Lee Judge
 Carol Juneau
 Christine Kaufmann
 Jim Keane
 Nancy Keenan
 Daniel Kemmis
 Allen Kolstad
 Deborah Kottel
 Bob Lake
 Jesse Laslovich
 Ralph Lenhart
 Dave Lewis
 Greg Lind
 Monica Lindeen
 Frank Bird Linderman
 Dave McAlpin
 Bill McChesney
 Washington J. McCormick
 Gary Matthews
 John Melcher
 Lee Metcalf
 Mike Milburn
 Terry Murphy
 John Musgrove
 Art Noonan
 James F. O'Connor
 Mark O'Keefe
 Alan Olson
 John Parker
 Gerald Pease
 François Jean Pelletier
 Arthur L. Peterson
 Ken Peterson
 Mike Phillips
 Jennifer Pomnichowski
 Debo Powers
 Jean Price
 Holly Raser
 Joe Read
 Michele Reinhart
 James A. Rice
 Rick Ripley
 Scott Sales
 Sarah Laszloffy
 Diane Sands
 Jon Sesso
 Jim Shockley
 John Sinrud
 Paul Sliter
 Veronica Small-Eastman
 Frank Smith
 Jon Sonju
 Carolyn Squires
 Donald Steinbeisser
 Sam V. Stewart
 Tom Stout
 Janna Taylor
 Bill Thomas
 Fred A. Thomas
 Joseph Tropila
 Brad Tschida
 George Turman
 Gordon Vance
 Kendall Van Dyk
 Dan Villa
 Frank Comerford Walker
 David Wanzenried
 Wendy Warburton
 Ted Washburn
 Jeffrey Welborn
 Burton K. Wheeler
 Benjamin F. White
 Kerry White
 Lea Whitford
 Carol Williams
 Franke Wilmer
 Bill Wilson
 Jonathan Windy Boy
 Brady Wiseman
 Tom Woods
 Max Yates
 Daniel Zolnikov

List of members by districts 

This is a list of current and former notable members of the Montana House of Representatives by term, name, and party.

District 1

District 2

District 3

District 4

District 5

District 6

District 7

District 8

District 9

District 10

District 11

District 12

District 13

See also
 List of people from Montana
 List of Montana state senators

References

External links 
 Members of the Montana State House of Representatives, 1890-2018 at politicalgraveyard.com
 MT State House at ourcampaigns.com

State Representatives